Viktor Nikolayevich Blinov (September 1, 1945 in Omsk, Soviet Union – July 9, 1968 in Moscow, Soviet Union) was an ice hockey player who played in the Soviet Hockey League. He played for HC Spartak Moscow. He was inducted into the Russian and Soviet Hockey Hall of Fame in 1968.

He played in his first international on February 26, 1965 against Canada. He won a gold medal in the 1968 Winter Olympics. He scored ten goals in 32 internationals, the last of which was on February 17, 1968.

Blinov died from a heart attack he suffered during hockey practice. He was 22 years old.

References

External links

 Russian and Soviet Hockey Hall of Fame bio

1945 births
1968 deaths
HC Spartak Moscow players
Ice hockey players at the 1968 Winter Olympics
Ice hockey players who died while playing
Olympic gold medalists for the Soviet Union
Olympic ice hockey players of the Soviet Union
Olympic medalists in ice hockey
Soviet ice hockey defencemen
Sportspeople from Omsk
Sport deaths in the Soviet Union